Wallagonia leerii, also known as the Great Tapah, helicopter catfish, and formerly the striped wallago catfish is a species of catfish native to Southeast Asia. Its habitat ranges from the river drainages of Thailand through the Malayan peninsula to the islands of Sumatra and Borneo in Indonesia. It has been used as food in Southeast Asia since ancient times. Overfishing for its prized meat has caused the population to significantly decrease. Furthermore, the breeding migration pattern of this fish is especially vulnerable to damming, which has also decreased the wild population significantly.

Until osteological research validated the genus Wallagonia in 2014, W. leerii was included in the genus Wallago.

The other two species of the genus Wallagonia, the Lesser tapah from the Mekong river basin and the Spotted tapah from the Kinabatangan river basin on Borneo, are currently considered as distinct species. There are, however, strong suspicions that these may in fact be subspecies of W. leerii, as the sole difference seems to lie in a slightly different coloration.

Description

The Great Tapah is a large fish, commonly attaining lengths of 150 centimetres and a mass of up to 86 kilograms. The size of this fish however can easily exceed the aforementioned lengths.  It is the second-largest catfish in its family and is only outsized by the wels, Giant pangasius and Mekong giant catfish. It has a short, rounded body and a long broad tail, the anal fin of the fish is about as long as the tail itself and it ends in a forked caudal fin. The pelvic fins of the fish are small, and there are no dorsal spines on it. The Great Tapah possesses a noticeable hump, atop sits its dorsal fin, which is small and almost elliptical. The head of this fish is long, and remarkably wide with a huge lower jaw that extends beyond its maxilla. The mouth of the catfish is inlaid with several rows of sharp teeth that enable it to grip prey. It is a piscivore, primarily feeding on small fish which are snatched mid-swimming and consumed whole.

Threats
The Great Tapah faces a multitude of threats, as it is prone to destructive fishing, competing with invasive species, loss of suitable habitat, and dam construction that impact its lifecycle. 

Splitting of species within the complex may give doubts to the true abundance of the species, meaning it could be far more restricted than once thought.

Mating
In July, adults migrate downstream to flooded grasslands to spawn. At night, the eggs are spawned near the surface.

References

Siluridae
Fish described in 1851
Taxa named by Pieter Bleeker